Milenko (Cyrillic script: Миленко) is a name of Slavic origin, primarily used as a masculine given name. Notable people named Milenko include:

People named Milenko

As a given name 
 Milenko Ačimovič (born 1977), Slovenian football player
 Milenko Bajić (1944–2009), Bosnian-Herzegovinian and Yugoslav football player and manager
 Milenko Bogićević (born 1976), Serbian basketball coach
 Milenko Bojanić (1924–1987), Yugoslav politician and Prime Minister of Serbia 1964–1967
 Milenko Bošnjaković (born 1968), Bosnian football manager
 Milenko Đedović (born 1972), Serbian football player
 Milenko Jovanov (born 1980), Serbian politician
 Milenko Kersnić (born 1946), Slovenian gymnast
 Milenko Kiković (born 1954), Serbian football player and manager
 Milenko Kovačević (born 1963), Yugoslav football player
 Milenko Lekić (born 1936), Serbian gymnast
 Milenko Milošević (born 1976), Bosnian football player
 Milenko Nedelkovski, host of the Milenko Nedelkovski Show in North Macedonia
 Milenko Paunović (1889–1924), Serbian composer and writer
 Milenko Pavlović (1959–1999), Yugoslav fighter pilot
 Milenko Savović (1960–2021), Serbian basketball player
 Milenko Sebić (born 1984), Serbian sports shooter
 Milenko Špoljarić (born 1967), Yugoslavian football player
 Milenko Stefanović (born 1930), Serbian clarinet player
 Milenko Stojković (1769–1831), Serbian revolutionary during the First Serbian Uprising
 Milenko Tepić (born 1987), Serbian basketball player
 Milenko Trifunovic, convicted of aiding and abetting the Bosnian genocide (2008)
 Milenko Topić (born 1969), Serbian basketball player and coach
 Milenko Velev (fl. 1844–1859), known as Master Milenko, Bulgarian architect
 Milenko Veljković (born 1995), Serbian basketball player
 Milenko Radomar Vesnić (1863–1921), Serbian politician and diplomat
 Milenko Vlajkov (born 1950), Serbian psychologist
 Milenko Vukčević (born 1966), Yugoslav football player
 Milenko Zablaćanski (1955–2008), Serbian actor, director, and play writer
 Milenko Zorić (born 1989), Serbian sprint canoeist

As a surname 
 Jovan Grčić Milenko (1846–1875), Serbian poet and physician
 Simon Milenko (born 1988), Australian cricket player

See also

 The Great Milenko, the fourth studio album released by American hip hop duo Insane Clown Posse
 Milenković, a patronymic name derived from Milenko

Slavic masculine given names
Serbian masculine given names
Masculine given names